On September 26, 2008, YIEC was renamed to ISM (International School of Myanmar).  It is located in Hlaing Township in Yangon, Myanmar (formerly Rangoon, Burma).

History
The International School of Myanmar was founded in 1998 by a group of educators and business leaders who felt there was a need for an affordable, high-quality international education option for Myanmar and expatriate students living in Yangon. From its beginnings as an International Child Zone with 48 students, the school and Colleges (WASC) and is a member of the East Asia Regional Council of Schools (EARCOS).

Elementary Building
The Elementary Building is the most recent built structure of ISM. It was opened on August 6, 2012. It is fitted with 2 elevators, 3 badminton courts, a basketball court, and 2 playgrounds and has the best facilities in all 3 buildings. It has over 50 classrooms for all grades and special classes. With 6 floors, it delivers the maximum education and fitness for all 600 students in the Elementary.

Middle School Building 
The Middle School was one of the original buildings of ISM, with over 20 classrooms, a music room, an art room, a soccer field, a basketball court, a big hall, and a café. Improvements had been made in the building to cope with the ever-growing number of Middle School students. It also has a theater that teaches the students acting skills. The middle school had been the host for various sports competitions for the other international schools in Yangon such as varsity soccer, varsity basketball, and even varsity baseball. It also hosts many friendly games in sports listed above and other sports like volleyball and badminton. ISM middle school students have been very excellent in regards to extracurricular activities as well, winning in things such as soccer for the last 4 consecutive year, dominating boy basketball games, etc. Also, in the 2015-2016 year, a select group of students joined the MUN of Yangon to participate in the annual event.

High School Building
The High School Building consists of 2 buildings connected by a walkway. The High School's facilities include an auditorium, indoor gym, and Computer and Science laboratories.

See also
High schools in Burma
List of international schools
Union of Myanmar
Yangon

References
Maw Maw San; Khin Nyein Aye Than. YIEC touts accredited status, Myanmar Times & Business Reviews (March 27 - April 2, 2006)

External links
International School of Myanmar's official site

 High schools in Yangon
 Education in Yangon
 Educational institutions established in 1998